Lakhpur is a village in Shaheed Bhagat Singh Nagar district of Punjab State, India. The village is administrated by Sarpanch an elected representative of the village.

Demography 
As of 2011, Lakhpur has a total number of 189 houses and population of 836 of which 404 include are males while 432 are females according to the report published by Census India in 2011. The literacy rate of Lakhpur is 72.19%, lower than the state average of 75.84%. The population of children under the age of 6 years is 81 which is 9.69% of total population of Lakhpur, and child sex ratio is approximately 800 as compared to Punjab state average of 846.

Most of the people are from Schedule Caste which constitutes 71.53% of total population in Lakhpur. The town does not have any Schedule Tribe population so far.

As per the report published by Census India in 2011, 500 people were engaged in work activities out of the total population of Lakhpur which includes 266 males and 234 females. According to census survey report 2011, 31% workers describe their work as main work and 69% workers are involved in Marginal activity providing livelihood for less than 6 months.

Kalirai Jatt, of Lakhpur, have originated from.the village of Khankhana.

Demography 
As of 2011, Lakhpur has a total number of 189 houses and population of 836 of which 404 include are males while 432 are females according to the report published by Census India in 2011. The literacy rate of Lakhpur is 72.19%, lower than the state average of 75.84%.

Most of the people are from Schedule Caste which constitutes 71.53% of total population in Lakhpur. The town does not have any Schedule Tribe population so far.

As per the report published by Census India in 2011, 500 people were engaged in work activities out of the total population of Lakhpur which includes 266 males and 234 females. According to census survey report 2011, 31% workers describe their work as main work and 69% workers are involved in Marginal activity providing livelihood for less than 6 months.

Education 
The village has a Punjabi medium, co-ed upper primary school established in 1966. The schools provide mid-day meal as per Indian Midday Meal Scheme. The school provide free education to children between the ages of 6 and 14 as per Right of Children to Free and Compulsory Education Act.

Amardeep Singh Shergill Memorial college Mukandpur and Sikh National College Banga are the nearest colleges.

List of schools nearby:
Govt Senior Secondary School, Ladhana Jhikka
Dashmesh Model School, Kahma
Govt High School, Jhander Kalan
Govt Gigh School, Khan Khana
Guru Ram Dass Public School, Cheta

Transport 

See also 
List of villages in India

References

External links 
 Tourism of Punjab
 Census of Punjab
 Locality Based PINCode

Villages in Shaheed Bhagat Singh Nagar district